The Macon Transit Authority is the primary provider of mass transportation in Macon, Georgia. Ten city bus routes serve the area, with most operating from Monday through Saturday. Like most major cities, the MTA uses various forms of transit advertising including bus shelters, bus benches, and city bus advertising throughout the combined city-county. Bus service has been prevalent in the city, since streetcar lines were removed in 1938. The private Bibb Transit Company controlled public transit in the city until their 1973 purchase by the county government.

Fare structure and operation 
Children under 13 can ride for free with an adult.

Riders have several ways of paying the fares. A Smart Card can be purchased in the transfer station, or they can use a smartphone app to purchase tickets. Cash can be used, but only coins in exact change.

Routes
As of November 2020, there are 10 routes in Bibb County
1 Vineville – Zebulon Road
2 Bellevue
3 West Macon – Macon Mall
4 North Highland
5 Ocmulgee – Tom Hill
6 Westgate – Bloomfield
7 Eisenhower Parkway – Chambers Road
8 East Macon
9 Houston – Peach Orchard
10 Second Street Corridor

Fleet 
There are currently 40 vehicles in the fleet. This includes 2 electric BYD K9S buses paid for by a  Federal Transit Administration grant awarded to Macon-Bibb County in 2017. The two new electric buses were unveiled on Oct 16, 2020.

References

External links

 Official Site

Macon, Georgia
Bus transportation in Georgia (U.S. state)
Transportation in Bibb County, Georgia
Transit agencies in Georgia (U.S. state)